is an otome visual novel video game developed by Otomate for PlayStation Vita that was first released on April 21, 2016. It was written by Yuma Katagiri, with art by Satoi. A sequel, Nil Admirari no Tenbin: Kuroyuri En'yōtan, was released in 2017, and was followed by another sequel, Nil Admirari no Tenbin: Irodori Nadeshiko, released in 2018 for the  Nintendo Switch. An anime adaptation of the original game, directed by Masahiro Takata at Zero-G, aired in Japan from April 8 to June 24, 2018.

Characters

Main characters

The player character. The daughter of the noble Kuze family that has begun to fall. Cheerful and intelligent, she has a very warm personality. However, she blames herself for the suicide attempt of her younger brother, which Tsugumi’s arranged marriage seemed to have been the reason behind. Because she was like a mother to her younger brother, sometimes, she just can’t leave people alone, and will try to help them.

A leader-like existence within the Search Team, he possesses a strong sense of justice. However, because he always speaks his mind, he easily ends up gives others the impression that he is a violent or rude person. His real name is 'Hayato Yashiro' and he's Tsugumi's fiancé chosen by her father.

Though he takes his job very seriously, he always draws the line at developing relationships with other people, and does not involve himself with anyone outside of work.

Well-mannered and polite, he takes on the role of disapproving of Hayato's blunt nature.
However, he also seems to dislike women. Because a special power awakened within him, he joined the Fukurou.

Law student at the Imperial University.
Proud son of Japan’s prime minister. Due to a certain incident, he is staying at the Fukurou’s living quarters. However, unused to this new lifestyle, he is always in a bad mood.

While he is a player, he is quite well-known as an author, especially for the tragedies he has written.
Due to a certain reason, he had to rely on connections and received permission to stay in the Fukurou’s living quarters.

Med student at the Imperial University.
Working at a part-time job in between his studies, he is a calm med student. He is often reading in cafes or the library, and meets Tsugumi by coincidence.

Supporting Characters

Tsugumi’s brother who tried to commit a mysterious suicide. The contents of the old book he was holding as he tried to committee suicide was a book filled with emotions like: greed, jealousy, wrath, agony, anger, regret, hatred.
He loved books, and was a big fan of Migiwa Shizuru. As his parents were often away from home, his older sister was like a mother to him, and was the one who loved him the most.

Development
Nil Admirari no Tenbin: Teito Genwaku Kitan was developed by Idea Factory's otome game branch Otomate. Character designs and illustrations were handled by Satoi while Yuma Katagiri wrote the scenario. It was released on April 21, 2016 in Japan for PlayStation Vita with a CERO D age rating. Annabel performed the opening theme titled "Sanctuary" while Suara performed the ending theme titled .

Reception

Nil Admirari no Tenbin: Teito Genwaku Kitan was the twelfth best selling video game in Japan during its debut week, with 6,987 copies sold. Dengeki Girl's Style enjoyed the game's visuals and the depiction of its world. Famitsu reviewers frequently commented on how they enjoyed the character designs and visuals, with its use of Taishō motifs and sepia tones.

Related media

Official fan book
An official fan book featuring artwork by Satoi, interviews with Katagiri and the game's director, and character profiles, was published by ASCII Media Works on July 21, 2016 in Japan.

Anime

An anime adaptation of the original game was planned to premiere in early 2018. The anime, simply titled Nil Admirari no Tenbin, is produced by the studio Zero-G, and is directed by Masahiro Takata. Yukie Sakō adapting Satoi's character designs into animation, music by Tomoki Hasegawa, and Tomoko Komparu overseeing the script. The anime aired from April 8 to June 24, 2018. The series ran for 12 episodes.

Manga
A manga adaptation written by Shō Yuzuki will be serialized in Square Enix's Monthly G Fantasy magazine starting January 18, 2018.

Sequel
A sequel, titled  was released on September 21, 2017 for PlayStation Vita, followed by another sequel,  on September 20, 2018 for the  Nintendo Switch.

Notes

References

External links
Official website 

2016 video games
Dark fantasy anime and manga
Gangan Comics manga
Manga based on video games
Otome games
PlayStation Vita games
PlayStation Vita-only games
Shōnen manga
Visual novels